Alfred Neville Lewis (1895–1972) was a South African artist. He was born in Cape Town, Cape Colony, and educated there and, later, at the Slade School of Art in London.

His father was the Reverend A. J. S. Lewis, who was Mayor of Cape Town, and on 4 October 1929, officially opened the Table Mountain Aerial Cableway.

Neville married Theo Townshend a fellow student. He became a member of the New English Art Club in 1920. When his marriage broke up in 1922 his two sons Tom and David went to Cape Town where they were raised by their grandparents and his daughter Catherine stayed with his ex-wife.

He served in World War I in France, Belgium, and Italy.

During World War II he carried on producing portraits in oil. He frequently painted and drew black South Africans. Lewis painted three portraits of Field Marshal Bernard Law Montgomery. He also painted several persons actively involved in the war effort ranging from a member of the South African Native Military Corps to a nurse. Several of these images were used for postage stamps during the war.

He married Countess Rosa Cecilie Karoline-Mathilde Irene Sibylla Anna zu Solms-Baruth, daughter of Friedrich, 3rd Prince of Solms-Baruth and his wife Princess Adelaide of Schleswig-Holstein-Sonderburg-Glücksburg, on 3 November 1955 and settled on Rowan Street, Stellenbosch where their children Caroline and Frederick Henry Lewis attended school.
 
Later the couple acquired a small holding opposite the Stellenbosch Golf Club where his wife and children could pursue their love of horse riding. After his death in 1972 his wife married Weber.

The painting Portrait of Albert van der Sandt Centlivres by Lewis was burned by demonstrators during the Rhodes Must Fall upheaval at the University of Cape Town in February 2016.

References

Art works 
 King Sobhuza II portrait of Sobhuza II of Swaziland
 Lt Col (Mrs) Doreen Dunning (1941)
 Young girl with scarf
 Pondo girl with a blue blanket
 Pondo woman
 Portrait of Lucas Majozi (1942)
 Seated nude
 Job Maseko, Job Masego, Black South African soldier who sunk a German supply boat in the Tobruk Harbour during World War II.

External links 
 Neville Lewis - Family reference
 Neville Lewis - South African History Online
 The Visual Construction of Gender and Race in the South African Military 1939 – 1945
 UDF Stamp Series

1895 births
1972 deaths
South African artists
South African expatriates in the United Kingdom
Artists from Cape Town
South African people of British descent
Alumni of the Slade School of Fine Art
World War I artists
World War II artists